The Fobes Octagon Barn is a historic building located south of Lanesboro, Iowa, United States. It was built in 1883, and at the time of its nomination it was one of 14 octagon-shaped barns from the 19th-century left in Iowa. The modification of the roof suggests this is a "Coffine type" structure similar to others built by Lorenzo Coffin. The general purpose barn has two granaries, horse stalls, and the rest of the space is open for agricultural machinery. It was listed on the National Register of Historic Places in 1986.

References

Infrastructure completed in 1883
Barns on the National Register of Historic Places in Iowa
National Register of Historic Places in Carroll County, Iowa
Buildings and structures in Carroll County, Iowa
Octagon barns in the United States